The Douglas sea scale is a scale which measures the height of the waves and also measures the swell of the sea. The scale is very simple to follow and is expressed in one of 10 degrees.

The scale 

The Douglas sea scale, also called the "international sea and swell scale", was devised in 1921 by Captain H.P. Douglas, who later became vice admiral Sir Percy Douglas and hydrographer of the Royal Navy. Its purpose is to estimate the roughness of the sea for navigation. The scale has two codes: one code is for estimating the sea state, the other code is for describing the swell of the sea.

State of the sea (wind sea)  

The Degree (D) value has an almost linear dependence on the square root of the average wave Height (H) above, i.e., . Using linear regression on the table above, the coefficients can be calculated for the low Height values and for the high Height values. Then the Degree can be approximated as the average between the low and high estimations, i.e.:where [.] is the optional rounding to the closest integer value. Without the rounding to integer, the root mean square error of this approximation is: .

Swell

Wave length and height classification 

Wavelength
Short wave 100 m –
Average wave 100–200 m
Long wave 201 m +

Wave height
Low wave 2 m –
Moderate wave 2–4 m
High wave 4.01 m +

See also 

Beaufort scale
Fujita scale
Saffir–Simpson hurricane scale
Sea state
Significant wave height
TORRO scale

References

External links 
EuroWEATHER–Douglas scale

Hazard scales
Water waves